The manga series A Certain Scientific Railgun is written by Kazuma Kamachi and illustrated by Motoi Fuyukawa. The manga is a spin-off of Kamachi's A Certain Magical Index light novel series published by ASCII Media Works. Taking place in the futuristic Academy City where students learn to become espers with various powers, the story follows Mikoto Misaka, an electromaster who is the third most powerful of only seven Level 5 espers, and her friends, taking place before and during the events of A Certain Magical Index.

The first chapter of Railgun was published in the April 2007 issue of ASCII Media Works' Dengeki Daioh shōnen manga magazine, and the succeeding chapters are serialized monthly. The first tankōbon volume was released by ASCII Media Works under their Dengeki Comics imprint on November 10, 2007; as of February 26, 2022, 17 volumes have been released. Seven Seas Entertainment licensed the manga in English and began releasing the series in North America starting with the first volume in June 2011. Railgun was adapted as a 24-episode anime television series by J.C.Staff, which aired in Japan between October 2009 and March 2010, followed by an original video animation on October 29, 2010. A second season, A Certain Scientific Railgun S, began airing in April 2013. A third season, A Certain Scientific Railgun T, premiered in January 2020.


Volume list

Chapters not yet in tankōbon format

 136.5. 
 137. 
 138. 
 139A. 
 139B. 
 140A. 
 140B. 
 141. 
 142A. 
 142B. 
 143A. 
 143B. 
 143C.

Notes

References

External links
Dengeki Daioh official website 
A Certain Scientific Railgun at Seven Seas Entertainment

Certain Scientific Railgun, A
A Certain Magical Index